Todor Manolov (3 August 1951 – 5 September 2014) was a Bulgarian athlete. He competed in the men's hammer throw at the 1972 Summer Olympics.

References

External links
 

1951 births
2014 deaths 
Athletes (track and field) at the 1972 Summer Olympics
Bulgarian male hammer throwers
Olympic athletes of Bulgaria
Sportspeople from Varna, Bulgaria